Innocence Reaches is the fourteenth studio album by American indie rock band of Montreal. It was released on August 12, 2016.

Music
The album has been characterized as electronic, synthpop and psychedelic.

Style and influences
Kevin Barnes cited the Beach Boys, the Beatles, Jack Ü, Chairlift and Arca as influences for the album.

Critical reception

At Metacritic, which assigns a normalized rating out of 100 to reviews from mainstream publications, the album received an average score of 68, based on 21 reviews. Writing for Exclaim!, Daniel Sylvester praised the "inspired, inventive, re-energized and wide-eyed" sound.

Track listing

Notes
 Every song is stylized in lowercase.

Personnel
Adapted from AllMusic.

 Bennett Lewis – guitar
 Clayton Rychlik – drums, percussion, piano 
 David Barnes – artwork
 Drew Vandenberg – engineer 
 Greg Calbi – mastering
 Jerrod Landon Porter – layout, lettering
 JoJo Glidewell – keyboards, piano, synthesizer
 Keiko Ishibashi – violin
 Kevin Barnes – bass, composing, drum programming, engineering, guitar, mixing, producing, synthesizer, vocals
 Philip Mayer – percussion
 Robert Parins – acoustic guitar, pedal steel
 Zac Colwell – brass, woodwind

References

2016 albums
Of Montreal albums
Polyvinyl Record Co. albums